Lectionary 116, designated by siglum ℓ 116 (in the Gregory-Aland numbering) is a Greek manuscript of the New Testament, on parchment leaves. Palaeographically it has been assigned to the 10th century.

Description 

The codex contains lessons from the Gospels of John, Matthew, Luke lectionary (Evangelistarium), on 226 parchment leaves. It is written in Greek uncial letters, in 2 columns per page, 20 lines per page, 12–15 letters in line. It contains musical notes. 
It is elegantly written.

History 

The manuscript was added to the list of New Testament manuscripts by Scholz.

The manuscript is not cited in the critical editions of the Greek New Testament (UBS3).

Currently the codex is located in the Biblioteca Laurentiana (Plutei VI.31) in Florence.

See also 

 List of New Testament lectionaries
 Biblical manuscript
 Textual criticism

Notes and references 

Greek New Testament lectionaries
10th-century biblical manuscripts